Isaac Kobina Donkor Abban  (1933 – 21 April 2001) was the Chief Justice of Ghana between 1995 and 2001. He was the ninth person to hold this position since Ghana became an independent nation.

Early life and education
Abban was born in 1933 at Agona Nkum in the Central Region. He had his secondary education at Mfantsipim School from 1948 to 1951. He left for the United Kingdom to study law at the University of Nottingham.

Career
He was called to the English bar on 24 June 1958. He returned to Ghana in 1959 and entered private practice until he was called to the bench of the High Court in May 1970.

Electoral Commissioner
Justice Abban was called to the Ghanaian bar on 18 April 1959. While a High Court Judge, he was appointed the electoral commissioner and supervised the controversial  'Union Government (UNIGOV)' referendum on 30 March 1978 during the Supreme Military Council (SMC) era. At a point during the referendum, he went into hiding in fear of his life from the military authorities. This was because he opposed the attempts to rig the UNIGOV referendum by the military SMC government. His successor Justice Kinsgley Nyinah supervised the 1979 election that saw Dr Limann win to become president of Ghana.

Chief Justice
He left for Seychelles where he served as the Chief Justice from 1990 to 1993. On his return to Ghana, he rejoined the Judicial Service of Ghana and was appointed to the Supreme Court of Ghana. On 22 February 1995, he was appointed Chief Justice by the President, Jerry Rawlings.

Death
Justice Abban was due to retire on 1 May 2001, for health reasons. He died a few days before that on 21 April 2001 in Accra, Ghana at the age of 67.

See also
Chief Justice of Ghana
List of judges of the Supreme Court of Ghana
Supreme Court of Ghana
Judiciary of Ghana
Electoral Commission of Ghana

Notes

External links
Picture of Justice I.K. Abban

20th-century Ghanaian lawyers
2001 deaths
1933 births
Chief justices of Seychelles
Ghanaian Freemasons
Ghanaian judges on the courts of Seychelles
Ghanaian Methodists
Mfantsipim School alumni
Alumni of the University of Nottingham
Justices of the Supreme Court of Ghana
People from Central Region (Ghana)